Gaj  is a village in the administrative district of Gmina Olsztynek, within Olsztyn County, Warmian-Masurian Voivodeship, in northern Poland.

Before the year of 1932, the city was called "Gay am Wittigwalde".

References

Gaj